The 1981 Major League Baseball postseason was the playoff tournament of Major League Baseball for the 1981 season. The season had a players' strike, which lasted from June 12 to July 31, and split the season into two-halves. Teams that won their division in each half of the season advanced to the playoffs. Teams faced each other in a League Division Series for the first time ever, a round of the postseason that would not return until 1995, where it became a permanent addition. The winners of the LDS would move on to the League Championship Series to determine the pennant winners that face each other in the World Series.

The four teams from last year's postseason – the New York Yankees, Houston Astros, defending American League champion Kansas City Royals, as well as the defending World Series champion Philadelphia Phillies, all returned to the postseason. The Los Angeles Dodgers and Oakland Athletics also appeared, and the Milwaukee Brewers made their first ever postseason appearance. This postseason was also the first to feature a team from outside the United States, the Montreal Expos, who made their sole appearance in the postseason this year; the team would not return to the postseason again until 2012, after they moved to Washington D.C. to become the Washington Nationals.

The postseason began on October 6, 1981, and ended on October 28, 1981, with the Dodgers defeating the Yankees in 6 games in the 1981 World Series. It was the fifth title for the Dodgers overall and their first since 1965.

Playoff seeds
Due to the strike-shortened season, the teams that finished first in their divisions during each half of the season qualified for the postseason. This was the last edition of the postseason to feature four teams per league until 1995 when the LDS was made a permanent addition to the format.

The following teams qualified for the postseason:

American League
 New York Yankees – 59–48, Clinched AL East (1st Half)
 Milwaukee Brewers – 62–47, Clinched AL East (2nd Half)
 Oakland Athletics – 64–45, Clinched AL West (1st Half)
 Kansas City Royals – 50–53, Clinched AL West (2nd half)

National League
 Philadelphia Phillies – 59–48, Clinched NL East (1st half)
 Montreal Expos – 60–48, Clinched NL East (2nd half)
 Los Angeles Dodgers – 63–47, Clinched NL West (1st half)
 Houston Astros – 61–49, Clinched NL West (2nd half)

Playoff bracket

Bracket

NOTE: Due to the strike in mid-season, the season was divided into a first half and a second half. The division winner of the first half (denoted E1, W1) played the division winner of the second half (denoted E2, W2).

American League Division Series

Oakland Athletics vs. Kansas City Royals

This was the first postseason meeting between the Athletics and Royals. The Athletics swept the defending American League champion Royals to return to the ALCS for the first time since 1975.

The Athletics stole Game 1 in Kansas City, 4–0, as Mike Norris pitched a complete game shutout, allowing only four hits. In Game 2, Steve McCatty delivered another complete game performance for the Athletics as they won 2–1 to go up 2–0 in the series headed to Oakland. In Game 3, the Athletics put away the Royals by a 4–1 score to advance to the ALCS.

These two teams would meet again in the 2014 AL Wild Card, which the Royals won 9–8 in 12 innings. The Royals would make their next postseason appearance in 1984.

New York Yankees vs. Milwaukee Brewers

This was the only postseason meeting between the Yankees and Brewers. The Yankees fended off a late comeback by the Brewers to win the series in 5 games to advance to the ALCS for the second year in a row.

In Milwaukee, the Yankees fended off a rally by the Brewers to take Game 1, and then won Game 2 in a shutout thanks to excellent pitching from Dave Righetti and Goose Gossage. When the series shifted to the Bronx for Game 3, the Brewers overcame a 1–0 deficit late to win by a 5–3 score, winning their first postseason game in franchise history. Pete Vuckovich and Rollie Fingers kept the Yankees' offense at bay in Game 4 and helped the Brewers even the series. The Brewers took a 2–0 lead after the first three innings of Game 5, but the Yankees went on a 7–1 run to win and advance to the ALCS.

The Brewers would return to the postseason the very next year, winning the ALCS against the California Angels to reach the World Series.

National League Division Series

Los Angeles Dodgers vs. Houston Astros

This was the first postseason meeting between the Dodgers and Astros. The Dodgers rallied from a two games to none series hole to defeat the Astros in five games, and advanced to the NLCS for the first time since 1978.

Game 1 was a pitchers' duel between Houston's Nolan Ryan and Los Angeles' Dave Stewart, which was won by the former as the Astros won off a walk-off two run home run from Alan Ashby. Game 2 was another pitchers' duel between both teams' bullpens that lasted 11 innings, and the Astros would prevail again as Denny Walling won the game for Houston with an RBI single to right field. When the series shifted to Los Angeles, the Dodgers got on the board in Game 3, winning 6–1 to avoid a sweep. Game 4 was another pitchers duel, this time between the Dodgers' Fernando Valenzuela and the Astros' Vern Ruhle. Both pitched a complete game, but Valenzuela took the win as the Dodgers prevailed 2–1 to even the series. Game 5 was a pitchers duel yet again, featuring Ryan for the Astros and Jerry Reuss for the Dodgers. Reuss won the duel as he pitched a five-hit complete game shutout as the Dodgers won 4–0.

The Astros would not return to the postseason again until 1986, where they fell to the eventual World Series champion New York Mets in six games in the NLCS.

In 2017, after joining the American League, the Astros would meet the Dodgers again in the 2017 World Series, which the Astros won in seven games for their first World Series title.

Philadelphia Phillies vs. Montreal Expos

This was the first postseason series ever played outside of the United States. In what would be their only playoff series win in Quebec, the Expos fended off a late comeback by the defending World Series champion Phillies to win the series in five games and advance to the NLCS for the first time in franchise history.

The Expos won their first playoff game in franchise history in Game 1 thanks to a solid pitching performance from Steve Rogers. Bill Gullickson and closer Jeff Reardon helped keep the Phillies' offense at bay in Game 2 as the Expos won 3–1, taking a 2–0 series lead headed to Philadelphia. In Game 3, the Phillies jumped out to a big lead and did not relinquish it, winning 6–2 to avoid a sweep. Game 4 was an offensive duel which the Phillies won in extra innings to even the series, capped off by a walk-off solo home run from George Vukovich. However, the Expos would ultimately prevail in Game 5, 3–0, as Rogers pitched a six-hit complete game shutout to win the Expos what would be their only playoff series win in Montreal.

This was the last playoff series won by the Expos/Nationals franchise until 2019. The Phillies would make their next postseason appearance in 1983.

American League Championship Series

Oakland Athletics vs. New York Yankees

This was the first postseason meeting between the Yankees and Athletics. The Yankees swept the Athletics, and returned to the World Series for the fourth time in six years. 

This ALCS was heavily lopsided in favor of the Yankees – the only close contest of the series was in Game 1, which the Yankees won 3–1. The Yankees then blew out the Athletics in Game 2 by ten runs to take a 2–0 series lead headed to Oakland. The Yankees completed the sweep in Game 3 as Dave Righetti and closer Ron Davis shut down the Athletics' offense, winning 4–0.

Both teams would face each other again in the 2000 and 2001 ALDS, and the Yankees would win both series. This was the last edition of the postseason to feature a team led by manager Billy Martin (the Athletics), who passed away in a car accident in 1989. 

This was the last time the Yankees won the AL pennant until 1996, where they defeated the Baltimore Orioles in five games en route to a World Series title. This was the last time the Athletics appeared in the postseason until 1988, where they swept the Boston Red Sox in the ALCS before falling in the World Series.

National League Championship Series

Montreal Expos vs. Los Angeles Dodgers 

This was the first postseason meeting between the Dodgers and Expos. The Dodgers narrowly defeated the Expos in five games, returning to the World Series for the fourth time in eight years.

The first two games in Los Angeles were split between both teams – the Dodgers won Game 1 by a 5–1 score, while Montreal's Ray Burris pitched a complete game shutout in Game 2 was the Expos won 3–0, evening the series headed to Montreal. Game 3 was a pitchers' duel between Montreal's Steve Rogers and Los Angeles' Jerry Reuss – at first it appeared as Reuss would win the duel as the Dodgers led 1–0 going into the bottom of the sixth, but the Expos scored four unanswered runs thanks to an RBI single from Larry Parrish and a three-run home run from Jerry White, and Rogers ended up pitching a complete game as the Expos won 4–1. However, Game 3 would be the last postseason game the team won in Quebec. The Dodgers blew out the Expos in Game 4 to even the series. In Game 5, the Expos took an early 1–0 lead in the bottom of the first, however the Dodgers tied the game in the top of the fifth. In the top of the ninth, the Dodgers took the lead for good thanks to a solo home run by Rick Monday, which has since been referred to as "Blue Monday" by Expos fans. They then closed out the series in the bottom of the ninth to secure the pennant. Game 5 of the 1981 NLCS was the last postseason game ever played at Olympic Stadium.

This would be the last appearance in the NLCS by the Expos/Nationals franchise until 2019, where they swept the St. Louis Cardinals en route to the franchise's first World Series title. The Dodgers would return to the NLCS in 1983 and 1985, but lost both to the Philadelphia Phillies and St. Louis Cardinals respectively. They would win their next pennant in 1988 against the New York Mets.

1981 World Series

New York Yankees (AL) vs. Los Angeles Dodgers (NL) 

†: postponed from October 27 due to rain

This was the first World Series since 1978 to not feature a team from Pennsylvania.

In the eleventh and most recent World Series meeting in the history of the Dodgers-Yankees rivalry, the Dodgers rallied from a two games to none series deficit to defeat the Yankees in six games to capture their first World Series title since 1965. 

The Yankees held off a late rally by the Dodgers to take Game 1 by a 5–3 score, and Tommy John and Goose Gossage helped shutout the Dodgers in Game 2 to go up 2–0 in the series headed to Los Angeles. The Dodgers rallied late in the fifth inning of Game 3 to get on the board, and Fernando Valenzuela pitched a complete game for the Dodgers. Game 4 was a slugfest that was won by the Dodgers, 8–7, to even the series. Jerry Reuss outdueled Ron Guidry in Game 5 as Reuss pitched a complete game in a 2–1 Dodgers victory, giving the Dodgers a 3–2 series lead headed back to the Bronx. The Dodgers blew out the Yankees in Game 6 to capture the title. The Dodgers were the last team to win the World Series at Yankee Stadium until the Florida Marlins did so in 2003.

To date, this is the most recent World Series between the Yankees and Dodgers. The Dodgers returned to the postseason in 1983 and 1985, but they would lose in the NLCS to the Philadelphia Phillies and St. Louis Cardinals respectively. They would make one more appearance in the World Series later this decade in 1988, where they famously upset the heavily favored Oakland Athletics in five games.

This would be the last postseason appearance by the Yankees until 1995, and they would not return to the World Series until 1996, where they defeated the Atlanta Braves.

References

External links
 League Baseball Standings & Expanded Standings – 1981

 
Major League Baseball postseason